Esau Tjiuoro (born 26 May 1982 in Okakarara, Otjozondjupa Region) is a Namibian football (soccer) goalkeeper with F.C. Civics Windhoek and the Namibia national football team.

Career
Tjiuoro has played in the Namibia Premier League since 2000. Prior to joining Civics, he played with Ramblers F.C.

References

1982 births
Living people
People from Otjozondjupa Region
Namibian men's footballers
Namibia international footballers
Association football goalkeepers
F.C. Civics Windhoek players
Ramblers F.C. players